The Hedjaz Jordan Railway is one of the two successor railways to the famous Hedjaz Railway. When the Ottoman Empire collapsed in 1920, the Hedjaz Railway, formerly under Ottoman control, was divided into 2 railways: the Chemin de Fer de Hedjaz Syrie (CFH) and the Hedjaz Jordan Railway (HJR). The HJR operated the line of the Hedjaz railway in Jordan (at the time British Palestine). When Jordan was formed in 1946, the railway served as the state railway of Jordan, though it was not owned by the state. In 1975 the HJR built a line branch line from Ma'an to Aqaba, a port city. The line was later sold to the Aqaba Railway Corporation in 1979. The Hedjaz Jordan Railway still operates today between the Jordan/Syria border, through Amman to Irbid.

Operations 
The Hedjaz Jordan Railway operates passenger trains from Amman to Damascus in Syria. The HJR also operates freight trains on its tracks.

Passenger services
 Amman to Damascus, departs 8:00am Monday and Thursday
 Damascus to Amman, departs 8:00am Monday and Thursday

Freight services
 Amman to Damascus, departs 8:00am daily
 Damascus to Amman, departs 8:00am daily

Stations
List of stations. This list is incomplete.
 Amman
Al-Jizah
 Az-Zarqa
 Al-Mafraq
 Al-qasr Station Um-Heran
 Alluban
 Dab’ha
 Al Samra

Locomotives
The following may not be a complete list.

Steam
Steam locomotives include:

Diesel
Diesel locomotives include:

Museum
There is a museum at Amman station. In 2003, it contained more than 250 exhibits, including murals depicting the development of the railway.

See also
Hedjaz Railway
Aqaba Railway Corporation

References

External links
 The Hedjaz Railway: Damascus to Amman, 1981
 A piece of railway history, 2006

Rail transport in Jordan
1050 mm gauge railways in Jordan
Hejaz railway